Lars Balk (born 26 February 1996) is a Dutch field hockey player who plays as a defender or midfielder for Kampong and the Dutch national team.

Club career
Balk started playing hockey at the age of five at his local hockey club MHC Vianen. When he was 12 years old and wanted to play on a higher level, he switched to Kampong. He made his debut for the first team of Kampong when he was 17 years old. Balk played in all four matches in the 2014–15 Euro Hockey League, where they were eliminated in the quarter-final. In his second Euro Hockey League, they reached the final and won the tournament.

International career
Before Balk made his debut for the outdoor senior team, he played for the indoor team in the 2015 Indoor World Cup, where they won the gold medal. He made his debut for the senior national team in January 2016 in a test match against Argentina. After he was not selected in the 2017 EuroHockey Championship squad for the senior team, he played in the 2017 EuroHockey Junior Championship. Balk played in all seven matches in the 2018 World Cup and scored one goal. They eventually reached the final, where they lost to Belgium. In June 2019, he was selected in the Netherlands squad for the 2019 EuroHockey Championship. They won the bronze medal by defeating Germany 4–0.

References

External links

1996 births
Living people
Dutch male field hockey players
Male field hockey defenders
Male field hockey midfielders
2018 Men's Hockey World Cup players
Field hockey players at the 2020 Summer Olympics
Olympic field hockey players of the Netherlands
SV Kampong players
Place of birth missing (living people)
Men's Hoofdklasse Hockey players
2023 Men's FIH Hockey World Cup players
21st-century Dutch people